Kobuta is an unincorporated community in Potter Township, Beaver County, Pennsylvania, United States.  It is located along the Ohio River, due west of Monaca, southwest of Industry, and southwest of Beaver.  The area was the site of a butadiene, and later a foamed polystyrene, chemical plant during World War II and in the 1950s, owned by the Koppers United Company, predecessor to Koppers Company, Inc.  The company produced the chemical butadiene, an ingredient of synthetic rubber.  The name of the area came from the combination of "Koppers" and "butadiene".  The community has largely disappeared from modern maps, except for a few business names.

Effectively all of Kobuta will become part of the Pennsylvania Shell ethylene cracker plant once it opens in the early 2020s.

Further reading
MacArthur, A. 1977. Kobuta—A History of the Land. Milestones, Vol. 3, No. 2. Beaver County Historical Society.
Walton, D.L. 1992. The Kobuta Story. Milestones, Vol. 17, No. 1. Beaver County Historical Society.

References

External links 
History of Kobuta
Another history of Kobuta
Brief mention in history of Potter Township

Unincorporated communities in Beaver County, Pennsylvania
Pittsburgh metropolitan area
Unincorporated communities in Pennsylvania